Playground is an album by  Robert Mazurek Chicago Underground Orchestra which was released on the Delmark label in 1998.

Reception

In his review for AllMusic, Rick Watrous states: "A revelation. Cornetist Mazurek and his Chicago Underground Orchestra create some of the freshest sounds of late-'90s jazz. Mazurek and Parker's original tunes have the loose improvisatory feel of Miles Davis and Herbie Hancock's late-'60s compositions, giving soloists free reign [sic] to strut their stuff. ... Imaginative use of instrumental colors and combinations prevail throughout the album".

On All About Jazz Jack Bowers said: "This is an interesting and varied session... Mazurek has abandoned neither melody, harmony nor rhythm, and the band's hard-bop origins can also be discerned from time to time ... Throughout, Rob and the band shrewdly employ uncommon elements - the sound of a glockenspiel or bamboo flute, for example - to accentuate their singular point of view. Everyone is on the same page, and those who fancy Jazz that veers slightly off the beaten path without self-indulgent cerebralism should find this picturesque Playground well-suited to whatever musical byways they might care to pursue"

Track listing
All compositions by Robert Mazurek except where noted
 "Blow Up" (Herbie Hancock) − 8:17
 "Flamingos Dancing On Luminescent Moonbeams" − 7:43
 "Boiled Over" − 8:08
 "Le Sucrier Velours" (Duke Ellington) − 2:06
  "Components Changes" (Jeff Parker) − 6:23
 "Playground" − 10:23
 "Jeff's New Idea" (Parker) − 6:34
 "The Inner Soul of H" − 3:02
 "Whitney" (Parker) − 7:07
 "Ostinato" − 8:08

Personnel
Robert Mazurek – cornet, bell, bamboo flute, toy trumpet
Jeff Parker – guitar, cowbell, recorder
Sara P. Smith − trombone, glockenspiel, recorder, muffin tin, voice, cymbals
Chris Lopes − bass, India flute, voice
Chad Taylor – drums, street sign
John Herndon − bongos (track 1)
Dan Bitney − congas (track 1)
Tony Pinciotti − percussion

References

1998 albums
Rob Mazurek albums
Delmark Records albums